The 1945 Coupe des Prisonniers was one of three motor races held on 9 September 1945 at the Bois de Boulogne, in Paris. They were the first notable motor races to take place after the cessation of the Second World War.

The 43-lap race was won by Bugatti driver Jean-Pierre Wimille, with Raymond Sommer over a minute behind in a Talbot-Lago and Eugène Chaboud third in a Delahaye. Wimille set fastest lap.

Results

References

1945 in French motorsport 
Motorsport in France